William Champion (1709–1789) is credited with patenting a process in Great Britain to distill zinc metal from calamine using charcoal in a smelter.

Background
After Abraham Darby I had left the Bristol Brass Company to form his own new copper works at Coalbrookdale, fellow Quaker Nehemiah Champion took over leadership. Nehemiah had three sons: John (1705–1794); Nehemiah (1709–1782); and the youngest William (1710–1789).

Early life and patent
As a young man, William Champion toured Europe to learn the art of brass making, returning to become a junior partner in the Bristol Brass Company in 1730. He then experimented for six years to develop a process to create zinc – then known as spelter. Using a scaled-up process similar to that used at the Zawar mines in India where this process was available centuries before William Champion rediscovered it, since the 12th century AD, he overcame the difficulties of zinc vaporising at 907 °C by introducing a condensing vapour into the process through distillation. He obtained a patent for his method in July 1738, and his system remained in production for over 100 years.

Under the Bristol Brass Company, from 1738 within works established at the Old Market, by September 1742 he had produced  of zinc per charge from six crucibles located in the furnace, at a cost of around £7,000. However, he had now created two sets of enemies:
 The local residents, who in September 1742 reported Champion to the City Council. They sought assurance that Champion would cease metal smelting at the site immediately.
 The zinc importers and traders. When he started his experimentations, spelter sold at £260 per ton. By 1750, this had reduced to £48, resulting in a loss to the traders who were trying to force Champion out of business.

Warmley Works
In 1742 father Nehemiah – a widower – married a widow, Martha Vandewall, the sister of Thomas Goldney III. The Goldney family owned land in Warmley, and in 1746 backed by the Goldney family, William left the Bristol Brass Company and began to construct the Warmley Works. With tools and manufacturing equipment supplied by the Darby Ironworks at Coalbrookdale, over the next few years Warmley Works became the biggest metal processing plant in the world, with outputs of zinc, copper, brass and other metals. After the death of his father in 1747, William was joined in the business by his brother Nehemiah, and sister Rachael as a shareholder.

In February 1750, William applied to the House of Commons for some form of recompense for the losses he had suffered in making the first home produced zinc, which he hoped would allow extension of his patented process. Although a committee reported agreed that the patent should be extended through an Act of Parliament, a counter petition by the powerful lobby of the merchants of Bristol delayed the passage, and William later abandoned the legal process. However, William continued to expand the business through development at both the Warmley site, as well as new furnaces at Kingswood, a forge at Kelston near the River Avon, and a battery mill at Bitton on the River Boyd. By 1754, he had: 
 '15 copper furnaces 12 brass furnaces; 4 spelter or zinc furnace; a battery mill or small mill for kettles; rolling mills for making plates; rolling and cutting mills for wire; and a wire mill of both thick and fine drawn kinds.  

His brother John Champion developed a refined process and patented in 1758 the calcination of zinc sulfide (zinc blende) to oxide for use in the retort process. The English zinc industry was concentrated in and around Bristol and Swansea.

Docks and Bristol floating harbour
By 1765, with excess capital on his hands, William commenced development of a new dock at Rownham on the eastern bank of the River Avon, which would be capable of holding 36 large ships. However, after the increased cost of construction depleted his resources, and with a distinct lack of trade, he sold the dock in 1770 to the Merchant Venturers for £1770, who renamed it The Merchants' Dock. During the dock's construction, William had also proposed creating a complete floating harbour at Bristol, by building lock gates on the River Avon where it junctioned with the River Frome. However, the plan was abandoned due to an estimated cost of £37,000.

Downfall
By 1767, the Warmley Company claimed to have a capital of £200,000 and to give employment to about 2,000 people. Further, William had taken out additional patents covering: the refining of copper by using wrought iron pipes to remove arsenic from the smelt; using pit coal instead of charcoal to make brass wire; using zinc sulphide instead of calamine to make his brass.

The company had been formed under the "Bubble Act", and in 1767 petitioned Parliament to change its status to incorporation. In return, the partners offered to invest another £200,000 worth of capital, including £30,000 into the production of brass pins. This brought about the combined wrath of other metal companies formed under the Bubble Act, as well as the pin makers of Gloucester, who petitioned that such an investment was 50% greater than their existing facilities. In April 1767 the Commons issued a warrant that gave authority for the preparation of Charter of Incorporation, but this was countered by the competitors. After lengthy legal proceeding, a second warrant was issued by the Attorney General in October 1767. This led to a further counter-petition, which claimed that the Warmley Company would become a monopoly. By March 1768, the opposition had won and no further steps were taken to obtain a Charter of Incorporation.

Due to the collapse of the process to incorporate, in April 1768 William's partners discovered that he had tried to withdraw part of his capital without permission, and he was instantly dismissed from the company. Because he could not pay his debts William Champion was declared bankrupt. He died in 1789.

Legacy
Now a debt-encased and loss-making enterprise, on 11 March 1769 the Warmley Works were offered for sale in Felix Farley's Bristol Journal. Sold to the Harford & Bristol Copper Company, they also obtained the rights to Champion's patents. Using the process but winding down the operations until 1809, they later sold the Bitton Battery Mill in 1825 for use as a paper mill.

Because of the American War of Independence, the price of tar greatly increased, which was used at the time as a sealant on ships. On 29 April 1780 an advert appeared in Sarah Farley's Journal offering for sale a process of making English tar, from the estate of the deceased William Champion. Later, a tar works was established within Bristol Harbour.

See also
National Smelting Company

References

P. K. Stembridge, The Goldney family: a Bristol Dynasty (Bristol Record Society 1998), 46–51.  
A. Raistrick, Quakers in Science and Industry (1950; Sessions Book Trust, York 1993), 192–6.

Engineers from Bristol
English Quakers
English metallurgists
Zinc
Copper alloys
1709 births
1789 deaths